The 1st constituency of the Vosges is a French legislative constituency in the Vosges département.

Description
The 1st Constituency of Vosges forms a band of territory running through the centre of the Department from north to south. It includes the Department's Prefecture and largest town Épinal.

Politically the constituency has been dominated by Gaullist parties since the beginning of the Fifth Republic. Michel Heinrich, the Mayor of Épinal, held the seat between 2002 and 2017 on behalf of the UMP.

Historic representation

Election results

2022

 
 
|-
| colspan="8" bgcolor="#E9E9E9"|
|-

2017

 
 
 
 
 
 
 
|-
| colspan="8" bgcolor="#E9E9E9"|
|-

2012

 
 
 
 
 
|-
| colspan="8" bgcolor="#E9E9E9"|
|-

2007

 
 
 
 
 
|-
| colspan="8" bgcolor="#E9E9E9"|
|-

2002

 
 
 
 
 
|-
| colspan="8" bgcolor="#E9E9E9"|
|-

1997

 
 
 
 
 
 
 
|-
| colspan="8" bgcolor="#E9E9E9"|
|-

Sources
Official results of French elections from 2002: "Résultats électoraux officiels en France" (in French).

1